Cuervea is a genus of flowering plants belonging to the family Celastraceae.

Its native range is Tropical America, Western Tropical Africa to Angola.

Species:

Cuervea crenulata 
Cuervea hawkesii 
Cuervea integrifolia 
Cuervea isangiensis 
Cuervea jamaicensis 
Cuervea kappleriana 
Cuervea macrophylla

References

Celastraceae
Celastrales genera